is a passenger railway station in located in the town of Taga,  Shiga Prefecture, Japan, operated by the private railway operator Ohmi Railway.

Lines
Taga Taisha-mae Station is the terminus of the Ohmi Railway Taga Line, and is located 2.5 rail kilometers from the opposing terminus of the line at Takamiya Station.

Station layout
The station consists of two bay platforms. The station is unattended.

Adjacent stations

History
It was renamed to its present name on April 1, 1998.

Surroundings
Taga Taisha
Taga Town Office
 Taga Municipal Taga Elementary School

See also
List of railway stations in Japan

References

External links

 Ohmi Railway official site

Railway stations in Shiga Prefecture
Railway stations in Japan opened in 1914
Taga, Shiga